New York State, one of the fifty states of the United States of America, is home to more than 320 beer breweries, as well as numerous brewpubs and bars. Throughout the last decade, the consumption of craft beer has grown to be a part of the state's culture. The following is a partial list of breweries located in the state. The list includes not only breweries of beer but also of sake, such as Brooklyn Kura.

Breweries

Closed Breweries

 A. Finck & Son's Brewery - Manhattan, New York City
Beverwyck Brewery – Albany
Central Brewing Company – Manhattan, New York City
Chelsea Craft Brewing Company – brewpub; opened in Chelsea, Manhattan, New York City in 1995; moved to the Bronx, New York City in 2016, but closed in 2017.
Consumers Brewing Company – Manhattan, New York City
 Dobler Brewing Company – Albany
 Ebling Brewing Company – The Bronx, New York City
 Empire Brewing Company – Syracuse – bottles, brewpub, opened in 1994, close in 2019. Intellectual properties acquired by Ellicottville Brewing Company.
 F. & M. Schaefer Brewing Company – Manhattan, New York City
 Folksbier Brewery  - Carroll Gardens, Brooklyn, New York City - Brooklyn, Kings - kegs, cans, taproom  – opened 2014, closed October 2021
George Ehret Hell Gate Brewery – Manhattan, New York City
George Ringler and Company Brewery – Manhattan, New York City
 Haffen Brewing Company – The Bronx, New York City
 Hedrick Brewery – Albany
Henry Elias Brewing Company – Manhattan, New York City
 Hinckel Brewery – Albany
Jacob Hoffman Brewing Company – Manhattan, New York City
Jacob Ruppert and Company Brewery – Manhattan, New York City
Joseph Doelgers Sons Brewery – Manhattan, New York City
Lion Brewery – Manhattan, New York City – In 1895, it was the sixth-largest brewery in the United States. Closed in 1944.
 Mander’s Brewery – Elmira, NY 1856 - 1920 
 Nedloh Brewing Company – Bloomfield – bottles, taproom, opened in 2014, closed in 2017. Space is currently occupied by Other Half Brewing.
Peter Doelgers Brewery – Manhattan, New York City
 Piels Beer – East New York, Brooklyn, New York City
 Rheingold Beer – Bushwick, Brooklyn, New York City
 Stouthearted Brewing – Lansing – brewpub, opened in 2011, closed in 2016
West Utica Brewery – Utica
 William Ulmer Brewery – Bushwick, Brooklyn, New York City

Other beer companies
 North American Breweries is based in Rochester and owns the Genesee Brewing Company, Pyramid Breweries, Magic Hat Brewing Company, and Portland Brewing Company.  They are also the U.S. importer for the Labatt Brewing Company.  North American Breweries is owned by Cerveceria Costa Rica, a subsidiary of Florida Ice and Farm Company.

See also
 Beer in the United States
 List of breweries in the United States
 List of microbreweries

References

External links
 New York State Brewers Association

New York
Lists of buildings and structures in New York (state)